Eric Schoenberg is an American guitarist known for his fingerstyle guitar playing, as well as a recording artist and designer of acoustic guitars.

He owns Eric Schoenberg Guitars, a guitar store in Tiburon, California, which sells vintage and luthier-made acoustic guitars.

Eric and his cousin Dave Laibman were among the first transposers of classical piano ragtime to the guitar. This resulted in their album, Contemporary Ragtime Guitar, on Folkways Records.

He has performed, toured, recorded and written extensively.

Publications
"Fingerpicking Beatles" published by Hal Leonard

Recordings

The New Ragtime Guitar (1971), Folkways Records, with his cousin David Laibman
Acoustic Guitar (1977), Rounder Records
Steel Strings (1982), Rounder Records
Late Night Conversations,  Live Music Recordings, a duet with Richard Scholtz

External links
Official site
[ Allmusic.com Eric Schoenberg]
The New Ragtime Guitar Album Details at Smithsonian Folkways
Eric Schoenberg Interview NAMM Oral History Library (2017)

Living people
Year of birth missing (living people)
American luthiers
Companies based in Marin County, California
Guitarists from California
American male guitarists
Transatlantic Records artists